Patrick Howley (born 1989) is an American reporter. , he was writing for National File. He is the former editor-in-chief of Big League Politics, In 2019, he worked as a freelancer for the Epoch Times.

Career
Howley has been a reporter for the Breitbart News Network in Washington, D.C., The Washington Free Beacon, and The Daily Caller. He previously was an assistant editor for The American Spectator.

In January 2017, Howley left Breitbart to start the far-right website Big League Politics. He has been criticized for his style of journalism and satire. Right Wing Watch has described Howley as a "racist, antisemitic, anti-vaccine conspiracy theorist."

In 2019, Howley broke the story of a blackface and KKK costume photograph in Virginia governor Ralph Northam's medical school yearbook after receiving a tip from a "concerned citizen". Howley's website also broke the news of sexual assault allegations against Virginia lieutenant governor Justin Fairfax.

In 2020, writing for National File, Howley broke the story of then-Democratic U.S. Senate candidate Cal Cunningham exchanging sexually suggestive texts with a woman who was not his wife.

As of 2022, Howley was hosting a program on Patriots' Soapbox, a QAnon-aligned streaming network.

On April 13, 2022, Howley went on an on-air racist rant regarding Anthony Mackie, a Black man hosting the CMT Music Awards: "I don’t know who this Black guy is who’s hosting it. It’s supposed to be country music. No offense. Y'all have hip-hop, basketball. Just fly with your flock, bro."

Antisemitism 
Howley was suspended from Twitter in May 2022, following reporting by The Daily Beast on numerous antisemitic and racist tweets.  In one such tweet, Howley "accused the musical artist Lizzo of advancing “hostile agitation against White males on behalf of jewish interests” because the record label she is signed to is led by a Jewish male.".

In January 2022, Howley repeatedly wrote on Twitter that "Zionists" were using Covid-19 vaccines to carry out "genocide".

On Twitter, Howley also "has written that “Zionist and Chinese institutions are genociding white people.” He has faulted conservatives for not stating that “the Fake News media” is “run by Jews.” Howley has posted that “Everything blacks hate about white people they are really just talking about Jews.” He has also claimed that the mainstream conservative movement “is run by leftists and owned by the Zionist foreign lobby to advance the goals of white demographic replacement through mass ‘legal’ immigration.” He tweeted, “Stop blaming Whitey for your problems. Realize Jewish people own everything.” He has also claimed that it is “just obvious” that Israel did the 9/11 terrorist attacks.

References

1989 births
Living people
American male journalists
Date of birth missing (living people)
Place of birth missing (living people)